Madame Pompadour is a 1931 German historical musical film directed by Willi Wolff and starring Anny Ahlers, Kurt Gerron, and Walter Jankuhn. Part of the tradition of operetta films, it portrays the relationship between Madame Pompadour and Louis XV of France. The film is not based on the operetta Madame Pompadour by Leo Fall. It was shot at the EFA Studios in Berlin while location filming took place at the Palace of Versailles. A separate French version A Caprice of Pompadour was also released.

Cast
Anny Ahlers as Marquise von Pompadour
Kurt Gerron as Louis XV
Walter Jankuhn as Gaston de Méville
Ida Wüst as Frau von Estrade, her partner
Ernö Verebes as Marcel de Clermount, cadet
Irene Ambrus as Madelaine Biron, tutor
Fritz Odemar as Minister Maurepas
Hans Rameau as The Dauphin
Wilhelm Bendow as Mélange, Pompadour's secretary
Max Ehrlich as Cerf, court banker
Gustl Gstettenbaur as a little cadet

References

Bibliography
 Klaus, Ulrich J. Deutsche Tonfilme: Jahrgang 1931. Klaus-Archiv, 2006.

External links

1931 films
1930s historical musical films
German historical musical films
Films of the Weimar Republic
Films directed by Willi Wolff
Films set in the 18th century
Operetta films
German multilingual films
Cultural depictions of Louis XV
Cultural depictions of Madame de Pompadour
Films scored by Leo Fall
German black-and-white films
1931 multilingual films
Films scored by Robert Stolz
Films scored by Eduard Künneke
1930s German films
Films shot at Halensee Studios